Dululu is a rural town and locality in the Shire of Banana, Queensland, Australia.

Geography 

There are a number of neighbourhoods in Dululu:

 Boogargan
 Bunerba
 Littles Crossing

The now-closed Dawson Valley railway line passed through the locality with two abandoned stations in the locality:

 Boogargan railway station
 Dululu railway station serving the town

History
The town's original name was Bunerba, but on 29 April 1915 Queensland Railways Department decided to name the new railway station Dululu to avoid confusion with Buneru, another town located near Wowan. The name derives from an Indigenous word meaning "soft".

Alma Creek State School opened in 1915 and closed in 1935.

Dululu State School opened circa August 1916 and closed on 11 April 1968. It was at 30 Bryant Street.

Dululu Post Office opened by 1920 (a receiving office had been open from 1915).

Bunerba Provisional School opened in February 1922. On 1 August 1924, it became Bunerba State School. It closed on 13 December 1996. It was at 88 Bunerba School Road.

Education
There are no schools in Dululu. The nearest government primary school is Wowan State School in neighbouring Wowan to the south-west. The nearest government secondary school is Mount Morgan State High School in Mount Morgan to the north-east.

Amenities
Dululu Hall is at 14 Bryant Street.

References

Further reading

External links 
 
 
 

Towns in Queensland
Shire of Banana
Localities in Queensland